Since the development of the university sector in Australia and the foundation of the first university (University of Sydney, 1850), a small number of Vice-Chancellors have served for 15 years or more with some portion of this time in office as Vice-Chancellor in Australia. They include:

29 years: Sir Anthony Brownless KCMG KSG (Melbourne 1858-87);

26 years: Sir William Mitchell (philosopher) KCMG (Adelaide 1916-42);

21 years: John Douglas Story (Queensland 1938-59);

20 years: Sir Stephen Henry Roberts CMG (Sydney 1947-67), James McWha AO (Lincoln 2018, Rwanda 2013-15, Adelaide 2002-12, Massey 1996-2001);

19 years: William Barlow (vice-chancellor) CMG (Adelaide 1896-1915); Sir Robert Strachan Wallace KCMG (Sydney 1928-47); Dianne Yerbury AO (Macquarie 1987-2006); Alan Gilbert (Australian academic) AO (Manchester 2004-10, Melbourne 1996-2004, Tasmania 1991-96); Paul Wellings CBE (Wollongong 2012-21, Lancaster 2002-2012);

18 years: Sir Raymond Priestley (Birmingham 1938-52, Melbourne 1934-38); Sir Stanley Prescott OBE (Western Australia (1953-70), Margaret Gardner AC (Monash2014-ff, RMIT 2005-14);

17 years: Sir George Currie (academic) (UNZ 1952-62, Western Australia 1945-52); Michael Birt (biochemist) AO CBE (UNSW 1981-92, Wollongong 1975-80); Brian Wilson AO (Queensland 1979-96); Roy Webb AO (Griffith 1985-2002); Glyn Davis AC (Melbourne 2005-18, Griffith 2002-05);

16 years: Sir Philip Baxter KBE CMG (UNSW 1953-69); Sir Louis Matheson KBE CMG (Monash 1960-76); Alec Lazenby AO (Tasmania 1982-91, UNE 1970-77); Ian Chubb AC (ANU 2001-11, Flinders 1995-2000); Gerard Sutton AO (Wollongong 1995-2011);

15 years: Ken McKinnon AO (Charles Darwin 2002-03, JCU 1997, Wollongong 1981-94); Dennis Gibson (academic) AO (QUT 1988-2003); Michael Osborne (La Trobe 1990-2005); John Hay (academic) AC (Queensland 1997-2007, Deakin 1992-95); Steven Schwartz (psychologist) AM (Macquarie 2006-11, Brunel 2002-2006, Murdoch 1996-2002); Janice Reid AC (Western Sydney 1998-2013); Peter Coaldrake AO (QUT 2003-17); Ian O'Connor AC (Griffith 2005-19), Sandra Harding (sociologist) AO (JCU 2007-2021), Peter Høj AC (Adelaide 2021-ff, Queensland 2012-20, Uni SA 2007-12).

italics: Gardner and Høj still in office (as at September 2022).

The current Chancellors and Vice-Chancellors/Presidents are given (as at May 2020).

See also
Lists of university leaders

References

University leaders
Australia